Kim Piitala Christofte (born 24 August 1960) is a Danish former professional footballer, who was part of the Denmark national football team that won the 1992 European Championship. Considered an elegant sweeper, left back or midfielder, his technique allowed him a nonchalant playing style.

Football career
Christofte started playing football for the youth teams of Ølstykke FC and Brøndby IF, and was included in the Brøndby senior team in 1979. In 1981, he became the first Brøndby player to be sold for a transfer fee, when he moved to Belgian club KSC Lokeren for £16.000. There, he played alongside fellow Dane Preben Elkjær, but as Christofte's contract ran out in 1984, he returned to Brøndby.

Christofte was a part of the Brøndby team that won the first Danish League in club history, and made his national team debut in September 1984. Having played four national team games, an injury stopped him from competing at the 1986 FIFA World Cup in Mexico. He once again moved abroad to play for Spanish club CD Málaga and Switzerland's FC Wettingen, but his stays at the clubs were unsuccessful, and for the next seven years he was absent from the national side, under legendary coach Sepp Piontek. He moved back to Denmark to play for Odense Boldklub in 1987, returning to Brøndby the following year.

Under Brøndby coach Morten Olsen, the team reached the semi-finals in the 1990–91 UEFA Cup, and Christofte was once again called up for the national team, now coached by Richard Møller Nielsen. He was selected to compete at UEFA Euro 1992. Despite his relative international inexperience (although 31), he would appear full-time in all five Danish matches in the tournament, as Denmark won the trophy. In his most memorable international moment, Christofte converted the final shot in the semi-final penalty shootout against the Netherlands, with a very short run-up, to secure Denmark a place in the final.

Following the tournament, Christofte moved abroad again, playing for 1. FC Köln in the German League. He suffered from injuries in his first season, and when he was dropped from the team by new team manager Morten Olsen, in the 1994 spring, Christofte used a release clause in his contract to leave the club a year earlier, in June. He moved on to Belgian club SK Lierse, but only played a single friendly match before family reasons prompted him to return to Denmark. His contract with Lierse was mutually terminated, which spelled the end of Christofte's professional career. He went back to play with his childhood amateur club Ølstykke FC, in the Danish second level.

Other ventures
In 2006, Christofte was a member of the winning Danish team in the PartyPoker.com Football & Poker Legends Cup, alongside Gus Hansen and Theo Jørgensen. The side defeated France, Ireland and the United States, on the way to a final success over Germany.

Honours
 Danish League: 1985, 1990, 1991
 European Championship: 1992

References

External links
 National team profile 
 

1960 births
Living people
Danish men's footballers
Denmark under-21 international footballers
Denmark international footballers
Ølstykke FC players
Brøndby IF players
La Liga players
CD Málaga footballers
Odense Boldklub players
1. FC Köln players
K.S.C. Lokeren Oost-Vlaanderen players
Lierse S.K. players
Bundesliga players
Belgian Pro League players
UEFA Euro 1992 players
UEFA European Championship-winning players
Association football defenders
Danish expatriate men's footballers
Expatriate footballers in Spain
Expatriate footballers in Belgium
Expatriate footballers in Germany
Danish expatriate sportspeople in Spain
Danish expatriate sportspeople in Germany
Danish expatriate sportspeople in Belgium
FC Wettingen players
Brønshøj Boldklub players
Expatriate footballers in Switzerland
Danish expatriate sportspeople in Switzerland
Danish poker players